Earle Douglas (Dougie) Meerwald was a pioneering Ceylonese musician. Dougie Meerwald was the vocalist of one of the leading Ceylonese swing and dance bands of the early 1950s - The Manhattans. Western popular music and dance band music was all the rage in South Asia after World War II and Ceylon was no exception.

In his youth Douglas Meerwald was a promising young cricketer carving a name for himself with the 1st XI team of Carey College Colombo. However Meerwald did not pursue cricket, his first love was music so he joined Don Daniel and the Ballroom Hornets and subsequently The Manhattans dance band.

The Manhattans

The band leader of The Manhattans was the well known Sri Lankan musician, Leonard Francke. Douglas Meerwald was the public face of The Manhattans, he had a powerful voice and he sang some of the well known songs of the 1950s of the Frank Sinatra, Bing Crosby, Gene Kelly, era. The Manhattans attracted some of the leading musicians of the day, including singer/saxophonist, Sam the Man - he joined the band in August 1957.

The Manhattans played to packed ballrooms at the Grand Oriental Hotel and the Galle Face Hotel. They were in great demand at major concerts and events in Colombo. Douglas Meerwald and The Manhattans had a strong fan base in Ceylon. He was also featured on music programs over the airwaves of Radio Ceylon in the late 1950s and 1960s including Talent Corner and Starmaker - two very popular music programs - both radio programs enjoyed a very large listenership on Radio Ceylon.

St. Luke's Church Borella Choir

Douglas Meerwald and his father and uncle, Earl and Clair were also members of one of the leading church choirs at St. Luke's Church Borella of the Church of Ceylon. In 2006 St. Luke's Church Borella celebrated 125 years. Members of the Meerwald family still attend the church services.

The choir at St. Luke's led by the Meerwalds have been on Christmas radio programs of Radio Ceylon and subsequently the Sri Lanka Broadcasting Corporation in the 1960s and 1970s.

Douglas Meerwald died in Colombo in October 2003.

Quotations about Douglas Meerwald

'Dougie Meerwald was the vocalist with the band,' says Sam as he spooled back to his career beginnings ... ' (Sam The Man)
                            
Source: Sunday Observer Colombo Sri Lanka

'Not content with Church singing, Douglas sang the standards with great acceptance. His interpretation of 'The Lady is the Tramp' has the stamp of class. Quite naturally band singing had to come and Douglas started with Don Daniel and his Ballroom Hornets. Later he joined The Manhattans ... he was on the air with The Manhattans on the popular series Bristol Nite.'

Source: 'A Singing Meerwald' - EMCEE Article in the Ceylon Daily News (Vernon Corea writing in 1968)

'Douglas Meerwald was born into a very musical and talented Burgher family in Colombo, Ceylon. The Meerwald Family were well known for being first class, first rate musicians on the island. Meerwald was a dashing cricketer and all rounder at Carey College Colombo in the 1950s. He even won the Spooner Prize at Carey College. His first love was music - this was his natural God given talent. Douglas Meerwald decided to explore his musical talent. He joined Don Daniels and the Ballroom Hornets and learnt his craft. He soon built up a reputation as one of Colombo's finest 'crooners'. Subsequently Douglas Meerwald joined one of the most versatile and swingiest dance bands in Ceylon - The Manhattans.'

Source: World Music Central

See also 
 Radio Ceylon
 List of Sri Lankan musicians

External links
 Official Tribute Site to Earle Douglas Meerwald
 World Music Central article on Douglas Meerwald - Sri Lanka's Big Band Musician
 Sri Lanka Broadcasting Corporation - Live Streaming
 Meerwald Ancestry
 Carey College Colombo website

Alumni of Carey College, Colombo
Burgher musicians
Sri Lankan Christians
Year of birth missing
2003 deaths